Hannes Germann (born 1 July 1956) is a Swiss politician and current member of the Swiss Council of States for the Canton of Schaffhausen. Elected to the council in 2002, he is a member of the Swiss People's Party (SVP/UDC).

External links

1956 births
Living people
Members of the Council of States (Switzerland)
Presidents of the Council of States (Switzerland)
Swiss People's Party politicians